Cephetola sublustris, the greasy epitola, is a butterfly in the family Lycaenidae. It is found in Sierra Leone, Ivory Coast, Ghana, Togo, western Nigeria, Cameroon, the Republic of the Congo, the Central African Republic, the Democratic Republic of the Congo, Uganda and north-western Tanzania. Its habitat consists of forests.

References

Butterflies described in 1904
Poritiinae